Tosebygda is a village in the municipality of Trøgstad, Norway.

Villages in Østfold